Carlito Joaquin Cenzon (25 January 1939 – 26 June 2019) was a Filipino Roman Catholic bishop.

Cenzon was born in the Philippines and was ordained to the priesthood in 1965. He served as titular bishop of Scebatiana and as bishop of the Apostolic Vicariate of Tabuk, Philippines, from 1992 to 2002. Cenzon served as vicar apostolic of the Baguio, Philippines, from 2002 to 2004. He was appointed the first bishop of the Diocese of Baguio in 2004 and served as bishop until 2016.

Notes

1939 births
2019 deaths
21st-century Roman Catholic bishops in the Philippines